"Chalk Outline" is the lead single from Canadian rock band Three Days Grace's fourth album, Transit of Venus. The band released many "snippets" of the song before August 14 to tease fans. It reached No. 1 on the U.S. Active Rock chart for a total of 10 weeks and won the "Rock Song of the Year" award given by Loudwire. Billboard ranked the song at number 8 on their "Greatest of All Time Mainstream Rock Songs" list.

Critical reception
The song was mostly met with positive reviews. Loudwire gave the song a 4/5 rating, saying that "Adam Gontier attacks the track with as much angst and aggression as ever." Billboard calls the song, "a welcome change of pace that certainly piques interest in what else Three Days Grace gets up to on the rest of the album."

Music video
"Chalk Outline" has a lyric video, which shows the lyrics of the song over a clip of a man walking around a city. The band also released an official music video for "Chalk Outline" on October 5. The video shows Adam Gontier walking through a city, singing and gesturing to the camera while passing the other band members on the way, culminating with the four of them meeting in a dark room, performing the song. The video was directed by Shane Drake.  It is the band's last music video to feature lead singer Adam Gontier, who departed the band on January 9, 2013.

Charts

Weekly charts

Year-end charts

All-time charts

Certifications

References

2012 songs
Three Days Grace songs
Music videos directed by Shane Drake
RCA Records singles
Songs written by Adam Gontier
Songs written by Barry Stock
2012 singles
Songs written by Craig Wiseman